Walter Tin Kit "Sneeze" Achiu (Chinese: 徐天杰) (August 3, 1902March 21, 1989) was an American football player of Chinese descent. He was a graduate of The Kamehameha Schools and Saint Louis College (now Saint Louis School) in Honolulu, Hawaii.  

Achiu is most well known for being the first person of East Asian descent to play in the National Football League. He was one of the first people of a minority to play in any major American professional sports league, preceding Jackie Robinson's entry to Major League Baseball by twenty years. 

He was elected into the University of Dayton Athletic Hall of Fame in 1974.

College career
Achiu was a standout three-sport athlete (football, baseball, and track) at the University of Dayton from 1922–1927.

Professional career
Achiu played for the now-defunct Dayton Triangles of the NFL in 1927 and 1928. He was primarily used as a running back and defensive back. He played in eleven games with the Triangles, starting five.

Achiu later became a well-known professional wrestler.

References

External links
 
 University of Dayton Athletic Hall of Fame Members
 DatabaseFootball.com: Walt Achiu
 NFL News: Pearls of Wisdom
 Honolulu Star-Bulletin:Sports Watch

Dayton Flyers football players
Dayton Triangles players
1902 births
1989 deaths
Players of American football from Honolulu
American sportspeople of Chinese descent
Hawaii people of Chinese descent